The Punisher War Journal or Punisher War Journal  is the title of two Marvel Comics comic book series featuring the character Frank Castle, also known as the Punisher. The first volume, published from 1988 to 1995, was spun off of a self-titled series featuring the vigilante's exploits.

After this, the character went through a number of incarnations in Marvel's imprints, such as Marvel Knights and MAX, that were outside of regular Marvel continuity. The second volume of War Journal, published between 2007 and 2009 by writer Matt Fraction, placed the character firmly in the ongoing Marvel Universe inhabited by superheroes such as the Avengers and Spider-Man, and super-villains such as Doctor Doom and the Masters of Evil. This was reflected in the series by tying into crossover events of the Marvel Universe proper, including "Civil War", "World War Hulk", and "Secret Invasion".

Publication history

Volume 1

The first volume of The Punisher War Journal ran 80 issues, cover-dated November 1988 to July 1995. Originally written and penciled by Carl Potts, and inked by Jim Lee, who soon became series penciler, it changed creative teams with issue #25 (December 1990) to writer Mike Baron and penciler-inker Mark Texeira. Chuck Dixon took over as writer with #38 (January 1992), continuing with it to the final issue, except for #65-74 (April 1994 – January 1995) which were written by Steven Grant. Others associated with the title include multi-issue pencilers Tod Smith, Ron Wagner, John Hebert, Hugh Haynes, Melvin Rubi, and penciler-inker Gary Kwapisz.

Volume 2

The series was relaunched the following decade, titled simply Punisher War Journal, beginning with a new #1 (January 2007). The initial creative team was writer Matt Fraction and artist Ariel Olivetti, with subsequent artists including Cory Walker, Scott Wegener, and Howard Chaykin. Later, writer Rick Remender joined as a co-writer until the title was canceled to make room for a new ongoing volume of Punisher that would be exclusively written by Remender.

The series had one annual, named If I Die Before I Wake released in January 2009 Simon Spurrier and drawn by Antonio Fuso and Lee Loughridge.

Collected editions

The Punisher Epic Collections

 Punisher Epic Collection Vol. 3 - Kingpin Rules (collecting "Punisher" Vol. 3 (1987) #11-25, "Annual" #1-2, 2019, 496 Pages,  
 Punisher Epic Collection Vol. 4 Return To Big Nothing (collects "Punisher" (1987) #26-34, "Punisher Annual" (1988) #3, "Classic Punisher" (1989) #1, "Epic Graphic Novel: Punisher - Return to Big Nothing" (1989), "Marvel Graphic Novel: Punisher - Intruder" (1989), "Punisher: Kingdom Gone" (1990), July 21, 2021  TPB

The Punisher War Journal
 Punisher: An Eye For An Eye (Vol. 1 series, collects "The Punisher War Journal" #1-3), January 1992,  (TPB)
 The Punisher/Wolverine: African Saga (Vol. 1 series, collects "The Punisher War Journal" #6-7), April 1992,  (TPB)
 The Punisher War Journal Classic, Vol. 1 (Vol. 1 series, collects The Punisher War Journal #1-8), August 2008,  (TPB)
 The Punisher War Journal by Carl Potts and Jim Lee (Vol. 1 series, collects The Punisher War Journal #1-19) September 2016

Punisher War Journal
 Punisher War Journal, Vol. 1: Civil War (collects Punisher War Journal vol. 2, #1-4), April 2007,  (HC), August 2007,  (TPB)
 Punisher War Journal, Vol. 2: Goin' Out West (collects Punisher War Journal vol. 2, #5-11), December 2007,  (HC), March 2008,  (TPB)
 Punisher War Journal, Vol. 3: Hunter Hunted (collects Punisher War Journal vol. 2, #12-17), April 2008,  (HC), July 2008,  (TPB)
 Punisher War Journal, Vol. 4: Jigsaw (collects Punisher War Journal vol. 2, #18-23), December 2008,  (HC), April 2009,  (TPB)
 Punisher War Journal, Vol. 5: Secret Invasion (collects Punisher War Journal vol. 2, #24-26, Annual #1), February 2009,  (HC), May 2009,  (TPB)
 Punisher War Journal The Complete Collection by Matt Fraction, Vol. 1 (collects Punisher War Journal vol. 2, #1-12), January 2019,  (TPB)

In popular culture
The book is referenced in Mallrats when Brody tells Renee that Issue #6 is one of the three items (along with his copy of  Fletch and the remote control to his VCR) he left at her house.

See also
List of The Punisher comics

References

External links
Grand Comics Database: The Punisher War Journal

1988 comics debuts
1995 comics endings
2007 comics debuts
2009 comics endings
Punisher titles
Comics by Matt Fraction
Comics by Jim Lee
Comics by Howard Chaykin
Comics by Rick Remender
Comics set in New York City